Buzzin' is a TV series that focused on musicians Cisco Adler and Shwayze. The show documented Shwayze and Adler's rise to fame and entertaining life in Malibu, California. Their style of music is a collaboration of hip-hop and alternative. The show aired on MTV and premiered on July 23, 2008.

Episodes
 Episode 1 - Super Monday
 Episode 2 - Das Booted
 Episode 3 - Losing It in San Diego
 Episode 4 - Sticker Shock
 Episode 5 - Working on Wango
 Episode 6 - Unhappy Birthday
 Episode 7 - No Hats on the Bed
 Episode 8 - Where's Warren

References

External links
 Buzzin' on MTV.com (Archive)
 

MTV original programming
2008 American television series debuts
2008 American television series endings
Television shows set in Los Angeles